The Women's 4 × 5 kilometre relay competition at the FIS Nordic World Ski Championships 2021 was held on 4 March 2021.

Results
The race was started at 13:15.

References

Women's 4 x 5 kilometre relay